Alexander Olshanetsky (1892–1946) was a Jewish-American composer, conductor, and violinist. He was a major figure within the Yiddish theatre scene in New York City from the mid-1920s until his death in 1946.

Life and career

Was born in Odessa, of Lithuanian Jewish descent, Olshanetsky began studying the violin at the age of 6. While a teenager he became a member of the orchestra at the Odessa Opera and Ballet Theater; notably touring with the ensemble throughout Imperial Russia. He then worked as chorusmaster for a touring operetta troupe in Russia. During World War I, he served as a regimental bandmaster in the Russian Army. With the army band he traveled to Harbin, Manchuria, and to Northeast China. In Harbin he began working as a composer and conductor for a Yiddish theater group.

In 1922 Olshanetsky emigrated to the United States. In 1937, his extended family members finally began to come to United States. He quickly became a major presence in the Yiddish theatre scene, and produced numerous musical works for the Lennox Theater in Harlem and the Liberty Theater in Brooklyn. His works were successful, and revivals of most of his works occurred in major cities throughout the United States. He also served as the Concord Hotel's first musical director.

References

External links
 Alexander Olshanetsky recordings at the Discography of American Historical Recordings.

1892 births
1946 deaths
American male composers
American male conductors (music)
American people of Ukrainian-Jewish descent
Jewish American composers
Ukrainian Jews
20th-century American conductors (music)
20th-century American composers
20th-century American male musicians
20th-century American Jews
Soviet emigrants to the United States